Elda Ashoti Grigoryan (10 March 1928 – 27 October 2016), known also as Elda Grin was an Armenian writer, psychologist, professor, and legal expert.

Biography
Grin was born in 1928 in Tiflis (Georgia). From 1943-47 she studied at Foreign Language Faculty of Yerevan Russian Pedagogical Institute. Grin was a Professor of psychology at Yerevan State University. She also published ten books of short stories, among them: “A Night Sketch” (1973), “My Garden” (1983), “We Want to Live Beautifully” (2000), and “Space of Dreams” (2004). In 2010 her short-story "The Hands" was published in Yerevan in a separate volume in 35 languages, including Icelandic, Luxembourgish, Chinese, Japanese, Hindi, Hebrew, etc. The Arabic version was translated by Harout Vartanian (an Armenian poet).

Links
 Biography
 Эльда Грин: Армянская писательница с московским детством/ Бахчинян Арцви

References

Armenian psychologists
Armenian women psychologists
Writers from Tbilisi
Georgian people of Armenian descent
1928 births
2016 deaths
20th-century Armenian women writers
21st-century Armenian women writers
20th-century Armenian writers
21st-century Armenian writers
Academic staff of Yerevan State University
American women academics
21st-century American women